Charlie Morgan may refer to:
 Charlie Morgan (musician) (born 1955), English musician, singer and songwriter
 Charlie Morgan (cricketer) (born 1989), English cricketer
 Charlie Morgan (soccer) (born 1962), American soccer defender
 Charlie Morgan (wrestler) (born 1992), English professional wrestler
 Charley Morgan (born 1929), sailboat racer and designer
 Charlie Morgan, stage name of Charlie Feathers, British musician

See also
 Charles Morgan (disambiguation)